Presidente Ríos Lake is located in the Aysén del General Carlos Ibáñez del Campo Region of Chile. It lies in the middle of the Taitao Peninsula.

The Chonos who often had a hostile relation with the Spanish kept the lake secret from them despite serving the Spanish as maritime pilots. Despite official discovery in 1945 the lake was already known to seafarers from Chiloé.

References

Lakes of Chile
Lakes of Aysén Region
Taitao Peninsula